Juan Carlos Reyes (date of birth unknown, died 2007) was de facto Federal Interventor of Córdoba, Argentina from April 9, 1970 to June 17, 1970.

References

Year of birth missing
2007 deaths
Place of birth missing
Governors of Córdoba Province, Argentina